This is a list of the best selling singles, albums and as according to IRMA. Further listings can be found here.

Top-selling singles
"The Climb" – Joe McElderry
"I Gotta Feeling" – The Black Eyed Peas
"Poker Face" – Lady Gaga
"Just Dance" – Lady Gaga featuring Colby O'Donis
"Fight for This Love" – Cheryl Cole
"Meet Me Halfway" – The Black Eyed Peas
"Hallelujah" – Alexandra Burke
"Bad Boys" – Alexandra Burke featuring Flo Rida
"Broken Strings" – James Morrison featuring Nelly Furtado
"Bad Romance" – Lady Gaga

Top-selling albums
I Dreamed a Dream – Susan Boyle
Circus – Britney Spears
The Fame/The Fame Monster – Lady Gaga
I Am... Sasha Fierce – Beyoncé
The E.N.D. – The Black Eyed Peas
No Line on the Horizon – U2
Where We Are – Westlife
Sunny Side Up – Paolo Nutini
The Script – The Script
Only by the Night – Kings of Leon

Notes:
 *Compilation albums are not included.

References

2009 in Irish music
Ireland top selllers
2009